John Raymond Manz (born November 14, 1945) is an American prelate of the Catholic Church. He severed as an auxiliary bishop of the Archdiocese of Chicago in Illinois from 1996 to 2021.

Biography

Early life 
Manz was born on November 14, 1945, in Chicago, Illinois, and attended St. Martha School in Morton Grove, Illinois. He graduated from Quigley Preparatory North Preparatory Seminary in Chicago in 1963, he then earned a Bachelor of Philosophy degree from Niles College in Chicago in 1967.  Manz then attended University of St. Mary of the Lake in Mundelein, Illinois, receiving a Master of Divinity degree in 1971.

Priesthood 
Manz was ordained to the priesthood for the Archdiocese of Chicago by Cardinal John Cody on May 12, 1971. He then served as associate pastor at two Chicago parishes: Providence of God until 1978, and St. Roman from 1978 to 1983. Manz was pastor of St. Agnes of Bohemia Parish in Chicago from 1983 to 1996, during which time he also served as dean of Chicago's Lower West Side (1987-1996).

Auxiliary Bishop of Chicago
On January 23, 1996, Pope John Paul II appointed Manz as an auxiliary bishop of the  Archdiocese of Chicago and as the titular bishop of Mulia. He was consecrated on March 5, 1996, by Cardinal Joseph Bernardin, with Bishops Wilton Gregory and Plácido Rodriguez serving as co-consecrators. 

As an auxiliary bishop, Manz served as episcopal vicar for Vicariate III until August 2011, when he transferred to Vicariate IV.Within the United States Conference of Catholic Bishops, Manz was chair of the Subcommittee on Pastoral Care of Migrants, Refugees and Travelers; and a member of the Committee on Cultural Diversity in the Church and Subcommittee on the Church in Latin America.

Pope Francis accepted Manz's letter of resignation as auxiliary bishop of the Archdiocese of Chicago on July 1, 2021.

References

External links
 Roman Catholic Archdiocese of Chicago

 

1945 births
Living people
Clergy from Chicago
University of Saint Mary of the Lake alumni
Roman Catholic Archdiocese of Chicago
Christianity in Chicago
21st-century American Roman Catholic titular bishops
Religious leaders from Illinois
Catholics from Illinois
20th-century American Roman Catholic titular bishops